Gudusia is a clupeid fish genus involving two species of shad in the rivers of South and Southeast Asia:

 Gudusia chapra (F. Hamilton, 1822) (Indian river shad)
 Gudusia variegata (F. Day, 1870) (Burmese river shad)

References
 

Alosinae
Fish of Asia
Freshwater fish genera
Ray-finned fish genera
Taxa named by Henry Weed Fowler